Přemysl Vlk (1982–2003) was a Czech slalom canoeist who competed at the international from 1997 until his death in 2003.

He won a gold medal in the C1 team event at the 2002 ICF Canoe Slalom World Championships in Bourg-Saint-Maurice and a silver medal in the same event at the 2000 European Championships in Mezzana.

Vlk died in a car crash on 13 July 2003 together with fellow Czech canoeist Daniel Vladař.

References

 

Czech male canoeists
1982 births
2003 deaths
Road incident deaths in the Czech Republic
Medalists at the ICF Canoe Slalom World Championships